Heteroschizomus is a genus of hubbardiid short-tailed whipscorpions, first described by Jon Mark Rowland in 1973.

Species 
, the World Schizomida Catalog accepts the following four species:

 Heteroschizomus goodnightorum Rowland, 1973 – Mexico
 Heteroschizomus kekchi Monjaraz-Ruedas, Prendini & Francke, 2019 – Guatemala
 Heteroschizomus orthoplax (Rowland, 1973) – Mexico
 Heteroschizomus silvino (Rowland & Reddell, 1977) – Guatemala

References 

Schizomida genera